This is a list of number ones on the Billboard Japan Hot 100 chart in 2008.

References 

2008 in Japanese music
Japan
Lists of number-one songs in Japan